Dato' Paduka Abu Bakar Taib (born 21 March 1943) is a former Malaysian politician, who represented the seat of Langkawi in the Parliament of Malaysia from 1995 to 2013. He was a member of the governing United Malays National Organisation (UMNO) party and from 1999 to 2004 was a Parliamentary Secretary in the Agriculture Ministry.

Abu Bakar was re-elected to Parliament in the 2008 election, having earlier survived a speculated challenge by Mukhriz Mahathir for the UMNO nomination for his seat. He was dropped from UMNO's list of candidates for the 2013 election, to be replaced by the state assemblyman for Kuah, Nawawi Ahmad.

Election results

Honours
 :
 Knight Commander of the Order of Loyalty to Sultan Abdul Halim Mu'adzam Shah (DHMS) – Dato' Paduka (2006)

References

Living people
1943 births
People from Kedah
Malaysian people of Malay descent
Malaysian Muslims
Members of the Dewan Rakyat
United Malays National Organisation politicians